Paul Christian may refer to:

 A pen name of the nineteenth century occult author Jean-Baptiste Pitois
 Paul Hubschmid, used this screen name
 Pablo Christiani a Jewish convert to Roman Catholicism

See also